Josine Koning (born 2 September 1995) is a Dutch field hockey player who plays as a goalkeeper for Den Bosch and the Dutch national team.

She participated at the 2018 Women's Hockey World Cup.

References

External links
 

1995 births
Living people
Dutch female field hockey players
Female field hockey goalkeepers
HC Den Bosch players
Field hockey players at the 2020 Summer Olympics
Olympic field hockey players of the Netherlands
Olympic gold medalists for the Netherlands
Medalists at the 2020 Summer Olympics
Olympic medalists in field hockey
20th-century Dutch women
21st-century Dutch women